Apy or APY may refer to:

Annual percentage yield
Anangu Pitjantjatjara Yankunytjatjara, abbreviated to APY, an area in South Australia governed by its Indigenous people 
Äpy, a magazine
Atal Pension Yojana, a national pension scheme in India